The Deutsche Filmakademie is an independently run organization with a focus on filmmaking in Germany. It was founded in 2003 in Berlin as a way to provide native filmmakers a forum for discussion and a way to promote the reputation of German cinema through publications, presentations, discussions, and regular promotion of the subject in schools. Since 2005, the winners of the Deutscher Filmpreis (colloquially known as the Lolas) are elected by the members of the Deutsche Filmakademie.

The academy is financed by membership dues of full members, honorary members, associate members, and friends. Full members must be recommended by at least two filmmakers who have applied for full membership and have been accepted. All winners of the Deutscher Filmpreis automatically get a full membership. Honorary members are appointed for their contributions to German film. Supporting members are companies and legal persons from the film industry. Friends are other filmmakers who want to support the work of the association.

The first presidents of the association were Senta Berger and Günter Rohrbach. In 2010, Iris Berben and Bruno Ganz were elected as their successors.

In 2008, the academy's internet service 24 – Das Wissensportal der Deutschen Filmakademie was launched. The portal provides an insight into the making of a movie, with the hope of making the work of independent filmmakers more transparent and accountable.

The Deutsche Filmakademie is not to be confused with the 1938 Deutsche Filmakademie, founded in Babelsberg.

See also
 German cinema

External links
 Official website
 24-Deutschen Filmakademie's knowledge portal

Film organisations in Germany
Non-profit organisations based in Berlin
Culture in Berlin
2003 establishments in Germany
Organizations established in 2003